Al Minhaj Be Sharh Sahih Muslim or Sahih Muslim bi sharh al-Nawawi is a book by Islamic scholar Yahiya ibn Sharaf al-Nawawi, a commentary on Sahih Muslim.

See also
List of Sunni books
Sharh Sahih Muslim (disambiguation)

References

External links
Online version of Al Minhaj bi Sharh Sahih Muslim

Sunni literature